Peltandra sagittifolia is a species of plant in the genus Peltandra. It is commonly known as the spoonflower or the white arrow arum, native to the southeastern United States from eastern Louisiana to eastern Virginia.

References

Aroideae
Flora of the Southeastern United States
Plants described in 1803
Flora without expected TNC conservation status